Don Enrique Jaime Ruspoli y Morenés, Caro y Arteaga, dei Principi Ruspoli (born February 2, 1935) is a Spanish aristocrat, third son of Camilo Ruspoli, 4th Duke of Alcudia and Sueca, and wife Dona María de Belén Morenés y Arteaga, García-Alesson y Echaguë, 18th Countess of Bañares.

He is 19th Count of Bañares with a Coat of Arms of de Zúñiga (Boletín Oficial of March 22, 1995 and Letter of March 30, 1995) and Prince of the Holy Roman Empire. He is a Doctor in Philosophy and a Professor of Philosophy at the Complutense University of Madrid, Gentleman of HH the Pope, Noble Guard,  Maestrante of Granada, and Knight of Honour and Devotion of the Sovereign Military Order of Malta.

Notable published works 

La marca del exilio: La Beltraneja, Cardoso y Godoy. 

Godoy: La lealtad de un gobernante ilustrado. 

Memorias de Godoy: Primera edición abreviada de memorias críticas  y apologéticas  para la historia  del reinado del señor D. Carlos IV de Borbón. 

Casa Señoriales de España.

Ancestry

Additional information

See also 
 Ruspoli

References 
 Instituto de Salazar y Castro, Elenco de Grandezas y Titulos Nobiliarios Españoles, Various (periodic publication)

External links 
 
 Enrique Jaime Ruspoli y Morenés on a genealogical site

1935 births
Living people
Complutense University of Madrid
Counts of Italy
Counts of Spain
Complutense University of Madrid alumni
Enrique
Knights of Malta